Senator Sherman may refer to:

Members of the United States Senate
John Sherman (1823–1900), U.S. Senator from Ohio from 1881 to 1897
Lawrence Yates Sherman (1858–1939), U.S. Senator from Illinois from 1913 to 1921
Roger Sherman (1721–1793), U.S. Senator from Connecticut form 1791 to 1793

United States state senate members
Alpheus Sherman (1780–1866), New York State Senate
Benjamin Sherman (Wisconsin politician) (1836–1915), Wisconsin State Senate
George C. Sherman (1799–1853), New York State Senate
Josiah Sherman (fl. 1860s–1870s), Georgia State Senate
Roger Sherman (politician) (1990s–2010s), Maine State Senate
Tom Sherman (politician) (born 1957), New Hampshire State Senate